The 2012–13 TSG 1899 Hoffenheim season is the 114th season in the club's football history. In 2012–13 the club plays in the Bundesliga, the top tier of German football. It is the club's fifth consecutive season in this league, having been promoted from the 2. Bundesliga in 2008.

The club also took part in the 2012–13 edition of the DFB-Pokal, where they were eliminated in the first round by fourth division side Berliner AK 07, losing 4–0.

Review and events
1899 Hoffenheim began their season with a 4–0 defeat against regional team Berliner AK, the largest victory for a fourth division club against a Bundesliga side. Tim Wiese made his competitive debut for the club.
On 3 December, manager Markus Babbel was released because of poor results, with the team in 16th place in the Bundesliga.

Competitions

Bundesliga

League table

Matches

Relegation play-offs
1899 Hoffenheim, as the 16th-placed team, faced third-placed 2012–13 2. Bundesliga side Kaiserslautern in a two-legged play-off.

DFB-Pokal

Squad

Squad and statistics

|-
! colspan="12" style="background:#dcdcdc; text-align:center;"| Goalkeepers

|-
! colspan="12" style="background:#dcdcdc; text-align:center;"| Defenders

|-
! colspan="12" style="background:#dcdcdc; text-align:center;"| Midfielders

|-
! colspan="12" style="background:#dcdcdc; text-align:center;"| Strikers

|}

In

Out

Sources

Notes

External links
 2012–13 TSG 1899 Hoffenheim season at Weltfussball.de 
 2012–13 TSG 1899 Hoffenheim season at kicker.de 
 2012–13 TSG 1899 Hoffenheim season at Fussballdaten.de 

1899 Hoffenheim
TSG 1899 Hoffenheim seasons